Donka Mincheva (Донка Минчева, born  in Karlovo) is a Bulgarian former weightlifter, competing in the 48 kg category and representing Bulgaria at international competitions. She participated at the 2000 Summer Olympics in the 48 kg event. She competed at world championships, most recently at the 2007 World Weightlifting Championships.

Mincheva was one of eleven Bulgarian weightlifters to test positive for a banned steroid two months prior to the 2008 Summer Olympics. Bulgaria withdrew its entire weightlifting team from the Olympic competition and Mincheva was banned from competing for four years. She then gave up her passion for weightlifting and is now living on the low, dealing with an alcohol addiction.

Major results

References

External links
 

1973 births
Living people
Bulgarian female weightlifters
Weightlifters at the 2000 Summer Olympics
Olympic weightlifters of Bulgaria
People from Karlovo
World Weightlifting Championships medalists
Doping cases in weightlifting
20th-century Bulgarian women
21st-century Bulgarian women